Anton Alfred Newcombe (born August 29, 1967) is an American singer, songwriter, multi-instrumentalist, producer, and founder of the music group The Brian Jonestown Massacre.

Newcombe was the subject of the 2004 documentary film Dig!, along with Portland, Oregon alternative rock band The Dandy Warhols.

Music
Newcombe started in the 1980s recording with a band called Homeland. Besides his own group, Newcombe has worked with a number of bands, most notably The Dandy Warhols, The High Dials, The Manvils, Innaway, and The Quarter After. He recorded and produced Dead Meadow's album Got Live if You Want It, and recorded a cover of Ewan MacColl's song "Dirty Old Town" with Lorraine Leckie on her 2008 album Four Cold Angels.

The Brian Jonestown Massacre
Newcombe founded the musical group The Brian Jonestown Massacre in San Francisco, California, in 1990. Core members in the early years included Matt Hollywood, Jeffrey Davies, Joel Gion, Travis Threlkel, Peter Hayes, Patrick Straczek, Ricky Maymi, Brian Glaze, Elise Dye and Dean Taylor, although the line up was subject to frequent changes. Newcombe wrote most of the group's songs, with Hollywood collaborating or contributing others on occasion. Following Hollywood's departure from the group in 1998, Newcombe's name became almost synonymous with The Brian Jonestown Massacre. Newcombe was also heavily involved in the post-production of his albums, often engineering and mixing them on his own. A prolific artist, he authored over 150 songs in a 15-year period.

In 2016, he composed the soundtrack for British indie film Moon Dogs, directed by Philip John.

Tess Parks & Anton Newcombe
Newcombe recorded two albums with Toronto singer-songwriter Tess Parks: I Declare Nothing in 2015, and the eponymous Tess Parks & Anton Newcombe in 2018.

L’Épée
In 2019, Newcombe founded the musical group L’Épée  along with French film star Emmanuelle Seigner and The Limiñanas.

A Recordings Ltd
Newcombe founded the record label A Recordings Ltd., where he releases records for The Brian Jonestown Massacre and other artists including Dead Meadow and the Vacant Lots.

Personal life
Part of Newcombe's life is featured prominently in the documentary film Dig! which focuses on the tense relationship between The Brian Jonestown Massacre and The Dandy Warhols as both bands struggle for success.
Newcombe has battled drug addiction, alcoholism and depression. He lives in Berlin with his wife, Katy, and their son, Wolfgang.

References

External links
 Official Band Website

1967 births
Living people
American expatriates in Germany
Singer-songwriters from California
People from Greater Los Angeles
American male singer-songwriters
American multi-instrumentalists
American rock guitarists
American male guitarists
American rock singers
American rock songwriters
The Brian Jonestown Massacre members
Guitarists from California
20th-century American guitarists
20th-century American male musicians
21st-century multi-instrumentalists
21st-century American male singers
21st-century American singers